Dexippus is a genus of Asian jumping spiders (family Salticidae) that was first described by Tamerlan Thorell in 1891. The genus name is derived from Publius Herennius Dexippus, an ancient Greek historian. , it contains four species, found only in Asia:
Dexippus kleini Thorell, 1891 – India, Sumatra
Dexippus pengi Wang & Li, 2020 – India, China
Dexippus taiwanensis Peng & Li, 2002 – Taiwan
Dexippus topali Prószyński, 1992 – India

References

Salticidae genera
Salticidae
Spiders of Asia
Taxa named by Tamerlan Thorell